Barycypraea fultoni is a species of cowry found in the Indian Ocean, off the western coast of Africa, primarily off the coast of Mozambique.

Subspecies and formae
Barycypraea fultoni amorimi Raybaudi Massilia, L., 1990 
 Barycypraea fultoni amorimi massieri (f) Lorenz, F. Jr., 1991 
Barycypraea fultoni fultoni (Sowerby, G.B. III, 1903) 
Barycypraea fultoni miniatra (f) Raybaudi Massilia, G., 1988

Description

Distribution
This species is distributed in the Indian Ocean along the coasts of East Africa and South Africa.

References

External links

Cypraeidae
Gastropods described in 1903